Cyperus pycnostachyus is a species of sedge that is native to western parts of Mexico.

See also 
 List of Cyperus species

References 

pycnostachyus
Plants described in 1837
Flora of Mexico
Taxa named by Carl Sigismund Kunth